Stoker is a surname.

Those bearing it include:

Amanda Stoker (born 1982), Australian politician
Austin Stoker (1930–2022), Trinidadian-American actor
Bob Stoker, Northern Ireland politician, Lord Mayor of Belfast (1999–2000)
Bram Stoker (1847–1912), Irish writer
Don Stoker (1922–1985), English football player and manager
Donald Stoker (historian), American military historian
Frank Stoker (1867–1939), Irish tennis and rugby union player
Gareth Stoker (born 1973), English footballer
Gerry Stoker (born 1955), British political scientist
Gordon Stoker, pianist and singer with The Jordanaires
Hendrik G. Stoker (1899–1993), South African Calvinist philosopher
Henry Hugh Gordon Stoker (1885–1966), Irish Royal Navy officer and actor also known as Dacre Stoker
James J. Stoker (1905–1992), American mathematician
Joanne Stoker (born 1983/84), British footwear designer
Joscelyn Eve Stoker (born 1987, stage name Joss Stone, English singer, songwriter and actress
Lewis Stoker (1910–1979), English footballer
Mary Stoker Smith (born 1969), reporter and anchor for KYW-TV in Philadelphia
Michael Stoker (1918–2013), British physician and researcher
Richard Stoker (1938–2021), British composer and writer
Robert Burdon Stoker (1859–1919), British shipping magnate and politician
Thornley Stoker, 1st Baronet (1845–1912), Irish surgeon, brother of Bram Stoker
Will Stoker, singer and musician with Will Stoker and the Embers